Lord Longyang was the favorite and lover of an unknown king of Wei, often speculated to be either King Anxi or King Jia, during the Warring States period of the Zhou dynasty. Little is known about him outside of his relationship with the king.

Story 
The story of Lord Longyang is recorded in the Records of the Warring States (traditional Chinese: 戰國策; simplified Chinese: 战国策; pinyin: Zhanguo ce) in a section called "Records of Wei" (traditional Chinese: 魏策; simplified Chinese: 魏策; pinyin: Wei ce), and does not appear in any other sources. The Records of the Warring States is generally considered a work of history. In it, Lord Longyang and the king are in a fishing boat together when Longyang begins to cry. After the king pressures him to say why he is crying, Longyang reveals that he is afraid that the king will be tempted by other, more beautiful men, and lose interest in him. The king then forbids anyone to mention other beauties in his presence under penalty of death. As a result of his status as a favorite of the king, Lord Longyang was given a small fief and a feudal title. His story took place sometime between 276 and 243 BCE, and is the second account of a male same-sex relationship in Chinese historical records.

Influence 
In his book Passions of the Cut Sleeve: The Male Homosexual Tradition in China, Bret Hinsch writes that the story of Lord Longyang serves as an example of both the sexual opportunism and openness of homosexuality in Zhou dynasty courts.

The story of Lord Longyang also influenced later Chinese literature. In the poetry of Ruan Ji, Lord Longyang is used, along with Anling, to figuratively evoke male beauty and love between men, and specifically royal favor.  The 1632 book The Forgotten Tales of Longyang or The Forgotten Stories of Longyang (traditional Chinese: 龍陽逸史; simplified Chinese: 龍陽逸史; pinyin: Longyang yishi) tells twenty stories of male same-sex prostitution in the late Ming dynasty. In it, the author, known by the nom de plume "Jingjiang's besotted with bamboo recluse," uses the story of Lord Longyang to evoke an earlier golden age characterized by feeling; this is juxtaposed with the stories and characters in the collection. The prologue of the late Ming dynasty collection The Rocks Nod Their Heads (traditional Chinese: 石點頭; simplified Chinese: 石点头; pinyin: Shi dian tou) references the story of Lord Longyang, among others, to argue that sexual relationships between men were normal because they had existed since antiquity. In the Ming and Qing collection The Cut Sleeve (a section of the Encyclopedia of Love) the story "Wan the Student," in which Wan falls in love with another male student, Lord Longyang is used (along with Anling) to refer to homosexuality.

The word longyang is also used in China to euphemistically refer to gay men, and has been through much of Chinese history, serving as a common classical literary term for male homosexuality. Longyang is also sometimes translated as "catamite," or used to refer specifically to the passive partner in intercourse. The phrase longyang pi (traditional Chinese: 龍陽癖; simplified Chinese: 龙阳癖) or "passion of Longyang" refers to male same-sex attraction or passion.

References 

Ancient LGBT people
Chinese LGBT people
3rd-century BC Chinese people